Specklinia jesupii is a species of orchid plant native to the Dominican Republic.

References 

jesupii
Flora of the Dominican Republic
Flora without expected TNC conservation status